The year 2004 is the 3rd year in the history of the Universal Reality Combat Championship, a mixed martial arts promotion based in the Philippines. In 2004 the URCC held 2 events beginning with, URCC 4: Return to the Dungeon.

Events list

URCC 4: Return to the Dungeon

URCC 4: Return to the Dungeon was an event held on April 24, 2004 at Casino Filipino in Parañaque, Metro Manila, Philippines.

Results

URCC 5: Beyond Fear

URCC 5: Beyond Fear was an event held on October 23, 2004 at Casino Filipino in Parañaque, Metro Manila, Philippines.

Results

See also

 Universal Reality Combat Championship

References

Universal Reality Combat Championship events
2004 in mixed martial arts